Diversified Communications Tower is a 2000-foot guyed mast for TV transmission in Floydale, South Carolina, United States. Diversified Communications Tower was built in  1981 and is 609.6 meters high. The tower itself is 585.6 meters; the antenna is 24 meters. It is one of the tallest structures in the United States. The Diversified Communications Tower broadcasts the signals of local ABC affiliate WPDE and CW affiliate WWMB; the tower is named after WPDE's previous owner.

See also
 WPDE
 Tallest structures in the U.S.
 List of the world's tallest structures

References

External links

Skyscraper page entry

Towers in South Carolina
Buildings and structures in Dillon County, South Carolina
Radio masts and towers in the United States
Towers completed in 1981
1981 establishments in South Carolina